Sheikh Abul Hossain is a Bangladeshi politician affiliated with the Jatiya Party who served the Satkhira-5 district as a member of the Jatiya Sangsad from 1986 to 1991.

Birth and early life 
Sheikh Abul Hossain was born in Satkhira District.

Career 
Sheikh Abul Hossain was elected as a Member of Parliament from the then Satkhira-5 constituency as a candidate of Jatiya Party in the 3rd Jatiya Sangsad elections on 7 May 1986 and the 4th Jatiya Sangsad on 3 March 1988.

He was the first chairman of Satkhira Zilla Parishad from 12 October 1988 to 10 December 1990.

References 

Jatiya Party (Ershad) politicians
People from Satkhira District
3rd Jatiya Sangsad members
4th Jatiya Sangsad members
Living people
Year of birth missing (living people)
Jatiya Party politicians